Harry James Burgoyne (born 28 December 1996) is an English professional footballer who plays as a goalkeeper for League One club Shrewsbury Town.

He began his career at Wolverhampton Wanderers, where he played eight first-team matches and was loaned to several clubs.

Career

Early career 
Burgoyne was born Ludlow, Shropshire. He joined Wolverhampton Wanderers at the age of 12, having been spotted filling in as a goalkeeper for the first time for local team Ludlow Town. Following unsuccessful trials at West Bromwich Albion and Birmingham City, he signed an initial two-year deal with the club before committing to a two-year professional contract in March 2015.

He joined Doncaster Rovers for a brief youth loan at the age of 16, which included an FA Youth Cup appearance against Manchester City. Burgoyne was nominated for Wolves' Academy Player of the Season for the 2014–15 season, which was won by Regan Upton.

In May 2015, he was part of the squad that won the U19 Bitzer Cup in Germany. Burgoyne played four of the five games, conceding just a single goal. The final went to penalties and he saved the fifth one with Wolves winning 5–4. Burgoyne joined the first-team squad on a pre-season tour of France in July 2015.

He attended Bitterley Primary School and Ludlow School, where he was a school prefect, head of house and sports captain.

Lowestoft Town (loan) 
In September 2015, Burgoyne gained his first experience of senior football with a one-month loan at National League North side Lowestoft Town. After recording a clean sheet on his debut, he claimed the Man of the Match award in the two following games. Making five appearances for the side, an initial extension on the loan was cut short after being recalled due to injuries in the Wolves U21 squad.

Corby Town (loan) 
In November 2015, Burgoyne joined National League North club Corby Town on a one-month loan. He made six appearances prior to his return. As part of the agreements between the two sides, Burgoyne continued to train with Wolverhampton Wanderers during his loan spell and was made available on matchdays.

A.F.C. Telford United (loan) 
In December 2015, he completed a loan move to National League North side A.F.C. Telford United to cover for injured goalkeeper James Montgomery. In February 2015, the club extended his loan for the remainder of the season. Burgoyne made nine appearances for the Bucks.

Wolverhampton Wanderers 
On 10 December, Burgoyne made his Football League debut in a 4–4 draw against Fulham. With Carl Ikeme and Andy Lonergan both injured, he was preferred over third-choice goalkeeper Jon Flatt. Burgoyne was named the Man of the Match by the club's sponsors.

On 28 January 2017, Burgoyne was again favoured in goal with Ikeme suspended and Lonergan unfit for Wanderers' fourth-round FA Cup tie at Liverpool. His side recorded a 2–1 victory in the giant-killing.

Loan spells
On 25 February 2017, Burgoyne joined Barnet on an emergency seven-day loan with Jamie Stephens and Josh Vickers out injured. He made his debut in a 1–0 defeat to Cambridge United later that day. After returning to Molineux, Burgoyne had his first international call-up, for the England under-21 friendly against Romania on 24 March 2018.

On 16 June 2018, Burgoyne joined League One side Plymouth Argyle on a season-long loan. He returned to Wolves a month later due a broken ankle. It was later announced that as Argyle were still paying contribution for his wages, Burgoyne would see through his season-long loan at The Pilgrims, having initially returned to Wolves for treatment.

Burgoyne returned to Wolves in December 2018, having never played a competitive game for Argyle, after his loan was terminated by both clubs by mutual consent. He then moved on loan to Scottish Championship club Falkirk in January 2019.

Shrewsbury Town
On 31 January 2020, after 12 years with the club, Burgoyne left to sign for League One side Shrewsbury Town on a short-term contract until the end of the 2019–20 season, making him the club's sixth January signing. On May 3, 2022 Shrewsbury Town exercised a contract extension to retain Burgoyne for an additional season.

Career statistics

References

External links 
 

1996 births
Living people
English footballers
Association football goalkeepers
Wolverhampton Wanderers F.C. players
Lowestoft Town F.C. players
Corby Town F.C. players
AFC Telford United players
Barnet F.C. players
Shrewsbury Town F.C. players
Plymouth Argyle F.C. players
Falkirk F.C. players
National League (English football) players
English Football League players
Scottish Professional Football League players